Sundampatti or officially called as Sundanapalli is a village lies on National Highway 48, which is located 6.8 kms away from District capital Krishnagiri and it is part of the Orappam Grama Panchayat under  Bargur Block of Krishnagiri district in Tamil Nadu. The village is known for its religious spots like Mariamman temple, St. Antony's Church, and Parshwa Padmavathi Jain Temple.

See also 
 Elathagiri
 Krishnagiri district

References

External links 
 Orappam Village

Villages in Krishnagiri district